In business and accounting, net income (also total comprehensive income, net earnings, net profit, bottom line, sales profit, or credit sales) is an entity's income minus cost of goods sold, expenses, depreciation and amortization, interest, and taxes for an accounting period.

It is computed as the residual of all revenues and gains less all expenses and losses for the period, and has also been defined as the net increase in shareholders' equity that results from a company's operations. It is different from gross income, which only deducts the cost of goods sold from revenue.

For households and individuals, net income refers to the (gross) income minus taxes and other deductions (e.g. mandatory pension contributions).

Definition
Net income can be distributed among holders of common stock as a dividend or held by the firm as an addition to retained earnings. As profit and earnings are used synonymously for income (also depending on UK and US usage), net earnings and net profit are commonly found as synonyms for net income. Often, the term income is substituted for net income, yet this is not preferred due to the possible ambiguity. Net income is informally called the bottom line because it is typically found on the last line of a company's income statement (a related term is top line, meaning revenue, which forms the first line of the account statement).

In simplistic terms, net profit is the money left over after paying all the expenses of an endeavor. In practice this can get very complex in large organizations. The bookkeeper or accountant must itemise and allocate revenues and expenses properly to the specific working scope and context in which the term is applied.

Net income is usually calculated per annum, for each fiscal year. The items deducted will typically include tax expense, financing expense (interest expense), and minority interest. Likewise, 
preferred stock dividends will be subtracted too, though they are not an expense. For a merchandising company, subtracted costs 
may be the cost of goods sold, sales discounts, and sales returns and allowances. For a product company, advertising, 
manufacturing, & design and development costs are included. Net income can also be calculated by adding a company's operating income to non-operating income and then subtracting off taxes.

The net profit margin percentage is a related ratio. This figure is calculated by dividing net profit by revenue or turnover, and it represents profitability, as a percentage.

An equation for net income
Net profit: To calculate net profit for a venture (such as a company, division, or project), subtract all costs, including a fair share of total corporate overheads, from the gross revenues or turnover.

Net profit = sales revenue − total costs

Net profit is a measure of the fundamental profitability of the venture. "It is the revenues of the activity less the costs of the activity. "Almost by definition, overheads are costs that cannot be directly tied to any specific" project, product, or division. "The classic example would be the cost of headquarters staff." "Although it is theoretically possible to calculate profits for any sub-(venture), such as a product or region, often the calculations are rendered suspect by the need to allocate overhead costs." Because overhead costs generally don't come in neat packages, their allocation across ventures is not an exact science.

Example 
Net profit on a P & L (profit and loss) account:

 Sales revenue = price (of product) × quantity sold
 Gross profit = sales revenue − cost of sales and other direct costs
 Operating profit  = gross profit − overheads and other indirect costs
 EBIT (earnings before interest and taxes) = operating profit + non-operating income
 Pretax profit (EBT, earnings before taxes) = operating profit − one-off items and redundancy payments, staff restructuring − interest payable
 Net profit = Pre-tax profit − tax
 Retained earnings = Net profit − dividends

Another equation to calculate net income:

Net sales (revenue) - Cost of goods sold = Gross profit - SG&A expenses (combined costs of operating the company) - Research and development (R&D) = Earnings before interest, taxes, depreciation and amortization (EBITDA) - Depreciation and amortization = Earnings before interest and taxes (EBIT) - Interest expense (cost of borrowing money) = Earnings before taxes (EBT) - Tax expense = Net income (EAT)

Another equation to calculate net income:

Net sales = gross sales – (customer discounts + returns + allowances)
Gross profit = net sales – cost of goods sold
Gross profit percentage = [(net sales – cost of goods sold)/net sales] × 100%.
Operating profit = gross profit – total operating expenses
Net income = operating profit – taxes – interest

Other terms

See also

Cost of goods sold
Dividend
Economic value added
Gross income
Gross margin (the difference between the sales and the production costs)
Income statement
Liquidating distribution
Net income per employee
Operating income
Operating Income Before Depreciation and Amortization (OIBDA)
Opportunity cost
Profit (accounting)
Profit margin (the ratio of net income to net sales)
Revenue

References

Profit
Accounting terminology

ja:利益#純利益